Accidents to the Taxes!! is a 1951 Italian comedy film directed by and written by Mario Mattoli.

Cast
 Riccardo Billi as  Gaetano Pellecchia
 Mario Riva as  Mario
 Dorian Gray as  Margot
 Aroldo Tieri as Il principe Oli
 Silvana Jachino as Signora Penna
  as Teodoro Penna
 Gisella Sofio as Silvia
 Pina Renzi as  Madame Costanza
 Alberto Sorrentino as  Arturo
 Giuseppe Porelli as Il conte Raffaele Borraciolo
 Anna Maestri as  La signorina Colombi
 Loris Gizzi as  Il capufficcio tasse
 Clara Bindi as Signora Martinelli
 Pina Piovani as  La guardiana del collegio 'Le Mimose'
 Nietta Zocchi as Insegnante di francese
 Liana Billi as Giovanna, moglie di Gaetano
 Guglielmo Barnabò as Il gran khan
 Enzo Garinei as  Lo snob
 Nico Pepe as Un professore

External links 
 

1950s Italian-language films
1951 films
1951 comedy films
Films directed by Mario Mattoli
Italian comedy films
Italian black-and-white films
1950s Italian films